Daniela Salguero Cuéllar (born 30 November 1992) is a Bolivian futsal player and a footballer who plays as a goalkeeper for Exótico Premium and the Bolivia women's national team.

Early life
Salguero hails from the Cochabamba Department.

Club career
Salguero has played for Club Aurora for six years, before joining Mundo Futuro in September 2019.

International career
Salguero capped for Bolivia at senior level on 12 March 2014, in a 0–2 away friendly loss to Chile. As a futsal player, she won the bronze medal with Bolivia at the 2018 South American Games.

References

1992 births
Living people
Women's association football goalkeepers
Bolivian women's footballers
People from Cochabamba Department
Bolivia women's international footballers
Club Aurora players
Bolivian women's futsal players
South American Games bronze medalists for Bolivia
Competitors at the 2018 South American Games